The National Memorial Day for the Victims of the Nanjing Massacre is a national memorial day observed in China on 13 December annually in honor of the Chinese victims of the Second Sino-Japanese War. The observance draws attention to Japanese war crimes during this period. It was established in 2014 by the Standing Committee of the 12th National People's Congress.

Although the memorial day is named after the Nanjing Massacre, its honorees are not limited to victims of that massacre. Instead the day is to commemorate all who were killed during the era of the Second Sino-Japanese War, including victims of the Nanjing Massacre, victims of chemical weapons, victims of biological warfare, victims of forced labor, comfort women, victims of the Three Alls Policy, and victims of indiscriminate bombing.

Background

Starting on 13 December 1937, soldiers in the Imperial Japanese Army carried out the Nanjing Massacre in Nanjing, the capital of the Republic of China. The massacre lasted into January 1938 and killed numerous people (hundreds to hundreds of thousands according to Japanese publications, or over 300,000 according to most Chinese historians). This constituted a crime under international law, for which the perpetrators were tried in the International Military Tribunal for the Far East and the Nanjing War Crimes Tribunal after World War II.

Beginning in 1996, each year on 13 December, the Nanjing air defense office would test air raid sirens throughout the city, to remind people not to forget China's national humiliation and to strengthen Nanjing residents' feeling towards national defense and their awareness of air defense.

Nanjing politician and National People's Congress delegate Zou Jianping made three proposals for 13 December to be made a national memorial day for the Nanjing Massacre, the third of which was in 2012. In 2014, Zou argued that it should be an international event. He said that "history should not be forgotten".

First national observance (2014)
On 27 February 2014, the Standing Committee of the 12th National People's Congress voted at their seventh meeting to pass the "Decision of the Standing Committee of the National People's Congress Regarding the Establishment of a National Memorial Day for the Nanjing Massacre Victims" (全国人民代表大会常务委员会关于设立南京大屠杀死难者国家公祭日的决定), establishing Nanjing Massacre Memorial Day as the 13th of December annually.

The first national observance of Nanjing Massacre Memorial Day was on 13 December 2014. The Central Committee of the Communist Party of China, the Standing Committee of the National People's Congress, the State Council, the National Committee of the Chinese People's Political Consultative Conference, and the Central Military Commission held the "Nanjing Massacre Memorial Day ceremony" at the Nanjing Massacre Memorial Hall in Nanjing. According to state media, an estimated 10,000 people were at the ceremony. Throughout the city, people honked car horns to honor the victims. The ceremony was led by Politburo Standing Committee member and NPC Standing Committee chair Zhang Dejiang. Communist Party general secretary Xi Jinping, Nanjing Massacre survivor  (夏淑琴), and Young Pioneer Ruan Zeyu (阮泽宇, a descendant of Nanjing Massacre victims) unveiled the National Memorial Tripod (dǐng, 国家公祭鼎), and Xi gave a speech. He called for friendly relations between China and Japan despite the painful history being commemorated, saying, "We should not bear hatred against an entire nation just because a small minority of militarists launched aggressive wars." This speech has become an important text in Xi Jinping Thought.

On the same day, the government of Hong Kong held a memorial ceremony at the Hong Kong Museum of Coastal Defence. Hong Kong Chief Executive Leung Chun-ying attended the ceremony and gave a wreath as an offering. Macao Liaison Office director , Macau chief executive Fernando Chui, CPPCC vice chair Edmund Ho, special commissioner at the Office of the Commissioner of the Ministry of Foreign Affairs of the People's Republic of China in the Macao Special Administrative Region Hu Zhengyue, and Macao Garrison commander Wang Wen (王文) presented wreaths. Other commemorative events were held in other parts of China.

Continued observance

Nanjing Massacre Memorial Day has been observed annually since 2014, with ceremonies at the Nanjing Massacre Memorial Hall.  The ceremony begins with the Chinese national anthem. Sirens go off at 10:01 a.m. CST, and drivers stop and honk their horns. The Chinese flag is flown at half-mast, ceremony attendees wear dark clothing with white flowers, and white doves are released to represent peace. Sixteen soldiers leave eight wreaths of chrysanthemums, a traditional flower for mourning.  The ceremony also includes a speech from a Politburo leader and the reading of a "Peace Declaration".

The observance is accompanied by extensive coverage in Chinese state media and is attended by Communist Party officials and by elderly survivors of the massacre.  Communist Party general secretary Xi Jinping attended the 2017 ceremony in addition to the inaugural 2014 event.

See also

 Victory over Japan Day
 Martyrs' Day (China)

Notes

References

External links 
 (in Chinese)

Observances in China
Nanjing Massacre
December observances
2014 establishments in China
Recurring events established in 2014